HMS Badger was an Acheron-class destroyer of the Royal Navy that served during the First World War and was sold for breaking in 1921. She was the eighth Royal Navy ship to be named Badger, after the mammal of the same name.

Construction
She was built under the 1910-11 shipbuilding programme by William Denny & Brothers of Dumbarton and was launched on 11 July 1911.  She and her sister-ship Beaver were completed with geared steam turbines for evaluation purposes and were known as "Parsons Specials".

Pennant numbers

Career

Pre-war
Badger served with the First Destroyer Flotilla from 1911 and, with her flotilla, joined the British Grand Fleet in 1914 on the outbreak of the First World War.

The Battle of Heligoland Bight
She was present on 28 August 1914 at the Battle of Heligoland Bight, detached from the First Destroyer Flotilla along with Jackal, Beaver and Sandfly. She shared in the prize money for the engagement.

The Ramming of U-19
U-19 was severely damaged but managed to return to port, was repaired and survived the war.

The Battle of Jutland
Of the crew of 1,021, only two officers and four crew were rescued. Badgers commanding officer at the time of the battle was Commander C A Fremantle.

SS Lanfranc
On 17 April 1917 at 1930 hrs,  was torpedoed four miles northeast of Le Havre by  while bound for Southampton. At the time she had 387 patients, of which 167 were German prisoners of war, and of these patients, 326 were cot-bound.

Service off Durazzo
Lieutenant Commander Geoffrey Corlett received the Italian Naval Decoration for service off Durazzo in Albania while serving as the captain of HMS Badger.

SS Tuscania
At 0700 hrs on 4 February 1918, Badger'' joined convoy HX-20 along with seven other Royal Navy destroyers from Lough Swilly, Northern Ireland. The ship was packed with United States soldiers, and 210 people died in the sinking.

Post-war
In common with most of her class, she was laid up after the First World War and in May 1921 she was sold for breaking.

Bibliography
Notes

References

External links 
 
 Battle of Jutland Crew Lists Project - HMS Badger Crew List

Acheron-class destroyers of the Royal Navy
Ships built on the River Clyde
1911 ships
World War I destroyers of the United Kingdom